Belsize Park Rugby Club is a rugby union club based in Central London, England. BPRC have five senior men's, two senior women's and one veteran men's teams. Home matches are played in Regent's Park.  The men's 1st XV previously played in London 1 North - a league at tier 6 of the English rugby union system - but following recent England Rugby adult male 'Future Competition Structure' changes, from the 2022/23 season the men's 1st team will play in Regional 2 Thames.

Current
Belsize Park Rugby Club have five regular men's, two women's and one men's vets sides. The men's 1st XV play in the newly launched RFU level 6 Regional 2 Thames division, while the men's 2nd, 3rd, 4th and Bulls (5th) XVs compete in the Middlesex merit leagues with the 2nd XV winning the Premier league most seasons. BPRC also field monthly Veterans and occasional 6th XV teams for pure social rugby. 

After launching with development fixtures in 2019/20, Belsize Park women's team debuted in the ‘Women's NC 3 South East (Central)’ league in the 2021/22 season, which they won as Champions. After promotion the women now play in Women's NC Division 2 in 2022/23, with a new 2nd XV adding to the growth of women's rugby at the club.  

The club trains at Coram's Fields and prides itself on being London's most central rugby club.

BPRC tours twice a year, once within The British Isles and once internationally. The club embarked on an unbroken series of international tours from 1989 to 2019, when COVID-19 halted the 2020 tour to Italy and the 2021 tour to Vietnam. Touring resumed in November 2021 and May 2022 with matches in Rugby, Warwickshire and County Donegal, Ireland. Destinations in the past have included mainland China, the Caribbean, North and South America, multiple Southern African countries and, more regularly, to European countries.

History
The original Belsize Park FC was founded in 1870 and was one of the twenty-one founding members of the Rugby Football Union. The club had folded by 1880, legend has it former members birthing Rosslyn Park, and Belsize Park Rugby Football Club was only formally re-established in 1971.

Junior rugby
Belsize Park RC has an affiliate Junior rugby section also in Regent's Park, called the Regent Park Royals coaching ages 6–12.

1st XV honours
Herts/Middlesex 3 South champions: 2003–04
London 2 North West champions: 2018–19

Clubhouse 
Based in prime central London the club does not have its own clubhouse, they use the facilities of local drinking establishments and treat this as their home 'club pub'. Local pubs traditionally bid to host the club on weekends providing discounts on food and drink for players and supporters.

 2022 - current: The Lock Tavern - Chalk Farm Road NW1
 2021 - 2022: Sports Bar & Grill Marylebone - Melcombe Place NW1
 2015 - 2021: The White Moustache - Stanhope Street NW1 (permanently closed)
 2010 - 2015: Sheephaven Bay - Mornington Street NW1
 2009 - 2010: The Masons Arms - Devonshire Street W1 (permanently closed)
 early - 2009: Chester Arms - Albany Street NW1 (permanently closed)

See also
Regent's Park
London Borough of Camden
Rugby Union in London

References

External links
Belsize Park Rugby Football Club Official Website
Belsize Park Rugby Football Club on Facebook
Belsize Park Rugby Football Club on Twitter

English rugby union teams
Rugby clubs established in 1870
Rugby union clubs in London
Belsize Park
1870 establishments in England